The palmchat (Dulus dominicus) is a small, long-tailed passerine bird, the only species in the genus Dulus and the family Dulidae endemic to the Caribbean island of Hispaniola (split between the Dominican Republic and Haiti).  It is related to the waxwings, family Bombycillidae.  Its name reflects its strong association with palms for feeding, roosting, and nesting.

The palmchat is the national bird of the Dominican Republic.

Taxonomy
In 1760 the French zoologist Mathurin Jacques Brisson included a description of the palmchat in his Ornithologie based on a specimen collected from the French colony of Saint-Domingue, modern Haiti. He used the French name Le tangara de S. Dominigue and the Latin Tangara Dominicensis. Although Brisson coined Latin names, these do not conform to the binomial system and are not recognised by the International Commission on Zoological Nomenclature. When the Swedish naturalist Carl Linnaeus updated his Systema Naturae for the twelfth edition in 1766, he added 240 species that had been previously described by Brisson, with one of them being the palmchat. Linnaeus included a brief description, coined the binomial name Tanagra dominica and cited Brisson's work.

The palmchat is the only species placed in the genus Dulus that was introduced by the French ornithologist Louis Jean Pierre Vieillot in 1816. The species is monotypic.

Description
They are olive-brown above, and heavily streaked with brown below. Their rumps, as well as the edges of their primary feathers, are dark yellow-green. They have strong yellow bills and russet eyes. They lack the soft silky plumage of the waxwings or silky-flycatchers. Adults show no sexual dimorphism; immature birds have dark throats.

Distribution and habitat
The species is endemic to the island of Hispaniola (in both Haiti and the Dominican Republic), and the adjacent Saona and Gonâve Islands, where it is common and widespread.  It inhabits areas from sea level to 1500 m asl where palm savannas can be found, or other open areas with scattered trees.  Where its food trees are present, it has adapted well to city parks and gardens.

Behaviour
Palmchats are very sociable birds, often seen in small flocks containing several pairs, which will roost closely together with their bodies in contact.

Breeding
The breeding season is mainly from March to June.  The birds build large, messy, communal nests of twigs in the crowns of palms (mainly royal palms Roystonea sp.).  Occasionally, in the absence of palms, other trees or even telephone poles may be used.  The whole nesting structure may be up to 2 m across, containing up to 30 adjoining nests with their own separate chambers and entrances.  The females lay clutches of 2-4 thickly spotted, grey-purple eggs.

Food
Palmchats feed on fruits and berries, including those of palms and of the Gumbo-limbo tree, as well as on flowers, especially those of epiphytic orchids.

Voice
They are voluble and noisy birds, with a large repertoire of gurgling and cheeping sounds constantly used in their social behaviour.
With their loud whistles, they are able to imitate the calls of hawks and kestrels which may be a surprise coming from their tiny bodies. They are typically classified as song birds, but hardly ever make a coherent song.

Conservation
As it is not approaching the thresholds for the population decline criterion of the IUCN Red List (i.e., declining more than 30% in ten years or three generations), it has been evaluated as being of Least Concern.

References

External links
Don Roberson's Bird Families of the World
The Endemic Birds of Hispaniola

Birds described in 1766
Taxa named by Carl Linnaeus
Endemic birds of Hispaniola
Birds of Hispaniola
Endemic birds of the Caribbean
Endemic fauna of Hispaniola
Birds of the Dominican Republic
Birds of Haiti
Higher-level bird taxa restricted to the West Indies
National symbols of the Dominican Republic
Bombycilloidea
Extant Miocene first appearances